Isthmicoma (also known as "Infundibuloma," and "Tumor of the follicular infundibulum") are a cutaneous condition characterized by flat, keratotic papules of the head and neck, skin lesions that are usually solitary.

Additional images

See also 
 Basaloid follicular hamartoma
 List of cutaneous conditions

References 

Epidermal nevi, neoplasms, and cysts